Acacia purpureopetala, more commonly known as Purple flowered wattle or Cupid's wattle, is the only pink flowering wattle in Australia. It grows in the Herberton district of north-east Queensland.  Under the Environment Protection and Biodiversity Conservation Act 1999 it is listed as critically endangered. It is only known from five discreet locations with approximately 7,0000 individual plants remaining.

Community members often refer to the plant as Cupid's wattle, Purple flowered wattle or pink wattle because of the colour of the bloom, which comes around Mother's day every year. It is the only wattle found in Australia with purple flowers.

Description
The small shrub has a spreading habit with prostrate branches. The angular to terete branches are angular are densely covered with white spreading hairs. It flowers between May and September.

Distribution
It is endemic to a small area in north eastern Queensland around Herberton, around Mount Emerald found to the south-west of Walkamin and at Stannary Hills.

See also
List of Acacia species

References

purpureopetala
Flora of Queensland